The 8th Bodil Awards was held 1955 in Copenhagen, Denmark, honouring the best in Danish and foreign film of 1954.

Prime Minister H. C. Hansen, who had been given the first Bodil Honorary Award in 1951, was guest of honour at a quite untraditional Bodil event. For the first and only time in the Bodil Award's history two film were awarded Best Danish Film: Carl Theodor Dreyer's Ordet and Sven Methling's Der kom en dag.

Emil Hass Christensen and Birgitte Federspiel each received an award for their performances in Ordet, Umberto D. directed by Vittorio De Sica won the Bodil Award for Best European Film, and On the Waterfront directed by Elia Kazan won the award for Best American Film.

Winners

Best Danish Film 
 Ordet directed by Carl Theodor Dreyer and Der kom en dag directed by Sven Methling

Best Actor in a Leading Role 
 Emil Hass Christensen in Ordet

Best Actress in a Leading Role 
 Birgitte Federspiel in Ordet

Best Actor in a Supporting Role 
 Not awarded

Best Actress in a Supporting Role 
 Not awarded

Best European Film 
 Umberto D. directed by Vittorio De Sica

Best American Film 
 On the Waterfront directed by Elia Kazan

References

Further reading

External links 
 8th Bodil Awards at the official Bodil Awards website

1954 film awards
1955 in Denmark
Bodil Awards ceremonies
1950s in Copenhagen